Fernando Roscio de Ávila (born February 8, 1955), known as Fernandão, is a Brazilian former volleyball player who competed in the 1976 Summer Olympics and in the 1984 Summer Olympics.

In 1976 he was part of the Brazilian team which finished seventh in the Olympic tournament. He played all five matches.

Eight years later he won the silver medal with the Brazilian team in the 1984 Olympic tournament. He played all six matches.

External links
 
 

1955 births
Living people
Brazilian men's volleyball players
Olympic volleyball players of Brazil
Volleyball players at the 1976 Summer Olympics
Volleyball players at the 1984 Summer Olympics
Olympic silver medalists for Brazil
Olympic medalists in volleyball
Medalists at the 1984 Summer Olympics